Ratkaj (also archaically spelled Rattkay) is a Croatian surname. People bearing this surname include:

Ivan Ratkaj (1647–1683), Jesuit missionary and explorer
Juraj Ratkaj (1612–1666), Jesuit historian and canon of Zagreb